New Year's Eve is December 31 on the Gregorian calendar, the last day of the year and the eve of the next year.

New Year's Eve may also refer to:

Film and television
 New Year's Eve (1924 film), a German silent film by Lupu Pick
 New Year's Eve (1929 film), an American lost silent film starring Mary Astor
 New Year's Eve (2002 film), a British short film by Col Spector
 New Year's Eve (2011 film), an American romantic comedy by Garry Marshall
 "New Year's Eve" (Louie), a 2012 television episode
 "New Year's Eve" (Modern Family), a 2013 television episode
 "New Year's Eve" (Up All Night), a 2012 television episode

Music
 "New Year's Eve" (song), by Snoop Dogg, 2010
 "New Year's Eve", a song by Nightbirde, 2020
 "New Year's Eve", a song by Pale Waves from All the Things I Never Said, 2018

See also
 New Year (disambiguation)
 New Year's (disambiguation)
 New Year's Day (disambiguation)